Chatte is also a synonym of Chardonnay.

Chatte is a commune in the Isère department in southeastern France.

Population

Twin towns
Chatte is twinned with:

  Roncone, Italy, since 1998
  Rot am See, Germany, since 2002

See also
Communes of the Isère department

References

Communes of Isère
Isère communes articles needing translation from French Wikipedia